7812 Erlestoke Manor is a preserved GWR 7800 Class steam locomotive, operated by the Great Western Railway and later British Railways. Owned by the Erlestoke Manor Fund, as at December 2022 it was in operational condition on the Severn Valley Railway.

GWR/BR operations
Built at Swindon Works in January 1939, it was first allocated to Bristol Bath Road depot.

Withdrawn from British Railways service in November 1965, it was sent to Woodham Brothers scrapyard in Barry, South Wales.

Preservation

The locomotive was purchased by the Erlestoke Manor Fund in June 1973. It was moved from Barry to a temporary home at the Dowty Railway Preservation Society, Ashchurch in May 1974, pending an eventual move to the Dean Forest Railway. However in 1976 Fund members approved a move to the Severn Valley Railway instead, where restoration was completed and the locomotive entered service in 1979. Withdrawn in 1985, it returned to service on 12 February 2008, as part of the SVR's anniversary reopening train.

Presently one of three GWR 7800 Manor Class locomotives based at the SVR, the other two being 7802 Bradley Manor (which is also owned by the Erlestoke Manor Fund) and GWR 7819 Hinton Manor. 7812's boiler ticket expired in January 2018, after which the locomotive was moved to Tyseley Locomotive Works for overhaul. It returned to the SVR in December 2022 and is scheduled to return to service in 2023.

Olympic Torch run
During the 2012 Summer Olympics torch relay for the London 2012 Olympics, 7812 carried the Olympic torch and its bearer Chris Stokes from Bewdley to Kidderminster with a brief stop outside West Midland Safari Park.

Depot allocations

References

External links
The Erlestoke Manor Fund

7812
7812
Railway locomotives introduced in 1939
Locomotives saved from Woodham Brothers scrapyard
Standard gauge steam locomotives of Great Britain